C.W. Jefferys Collegiate Institute is a semestered public secondary school in the Keele and Finch area of Toronto, Ontario, Canada.

History

The school was founded in 1965. It was named after Charles William Jefferys, a Canadian artist whose work has contributed much to education in the areas of Canadian History and Art. The first Head of the Art Department was James Meechan, a stained glass artist.

Graduation rates at the school, which had been low, improved significantly after 2015, when, as part of a school board pilot project, grade 9 and 10 classes were destreamed to create more flexibility for students. Principal Monday Gala was later recognized as an outstanding educator for this initiative.

Academics
The school offers a Visual Arts Program which draws students from the neighbouring school area; many of the teaching staff for this program are practicing artists. Additionally, it is home to the ESTeM Enriched Science, Technology and Mathematics Program - a project based, hands-on, exploratory approach to Sciences, Mathematics, and Computer Technology.

The school participates in York University's Advanced Credit Experience (ACE) program, which provides co-operative learning experiences in the community.

The school also runs student success initiatives supporting "at risk" students through the Learning to 18 pilot project, "Stay Connected", mentorship  and the credit recovery program offered at the school. There is also an after school activity program and a Focus on Youth summer program.

The academic and student support initiatives have resulted in an increasing number of students securing bursaries or scholarships for post-secondary education.

Athletics
Badminton (Co-ed)
Baseball (Boys)
Basketball ( only boys)
Heroes (Co-ed)
Chess
Cricket (Girls)
Cross Country (Co-ed)
Football (Boys)
Soccer (Girls & boys)
Softball (Girls) [Upcoming]
Swimming (Co-ed)
Track & Field (Co-ed)
Ultimate Frisbee (Co-ed)
Volleyball (Girls, boys & co-ed)
Wrestling (Co-ed)

Extra Curricular Clubs
Anime club
Boundless Adventures
Choir
Drumline
Ecological team
Equity
Gay-Straight Alliance
Jazz band
Rock band
Robotics
Leaders Today
Go LOCAL
Chess club
Generation Change
Prom Committee
Welcoming Committee
STARS

Notable alumni
Gabe Gala, Canadian soccer player.
Mark Simms
Jordan Manners, First student shot dead at an Ontario High School 
Paul Nguyen
Paul Godfrey, former Chairman of Metropolitan Toronto
Luther Brown, choreographer/judge on So You Think You Can Dance Canada→
Jully Black, award-winning Juno Award winner for Canadian R & B Artist
Tom Rakocevic, Member of Provincial Parliament for Humber River-Black Creek since 2018

Incidents
In 2007, a student was shot and killed in the hallway of the school. This was the first such incident in a Toronto school.

In 2017, a student on a school day trip drowned after being allowed to participate in water activities in spite of having failed the required swimming test.

See also
List of high schools in Ontario
List of school related attacks

References

External links
 C. W. Jefferys Collegiate Institute at the Toronto District School Board website

High schools in Toronto
History of Toronto
Schools in the TDSB
Crime in Ontario
Educational institutions established in 1965
1965 establishments in Ontario